The US Post Office-Lexington Main is a historic post office at 1661 Massachusetts Avenue in Lexington, Massachusetts. The single story brick Georgian Revival building was built in 1937 as part of a Depression era works program. The building has fairly modest styling: it has a belfry and cupola, and its entry is flanked by fluted engaged columns, and topped by a simple entablature, and an eagle set in a carved recess. The interior has marble terrazzo flooring, and marble wainscoting below otherwise plaster walls.

The building was listed on the National Register of Historic Places in 1986.

See also 

National Register of Historic Places listings in Middlesex County, Massachusetts

List of United States post offices

References 

Lexington
Buildings and structures in Lexington, Massachusetts
National Register of Historic Places in Middlesex County, Massachusetts